Kadha Parayum Theruvoram is a 2009 Malayalam film written and directed by Sunil. The star cast include Kalabhavan Mani, Padmapriya and novelist Punathil Kunhabdulla playing important roles. Three hundred children support the central characters including the characters played by Javed, Aakash, Abhinav, Amith and Mahek. Script and dialogues are by Sarjulan and the music is by Ramesh Narayan. The film was one of the nominees for the National Award.

Plot 
Four children are brought up in the street. They were under the custody of a street gang. One day they escapes from the mafia who made them beg along the streets. The rest of the movie is how the kids survive on the streets by themselves.

Cast 
 Kalabhavan Mani
 Padmapriya as Neeraja
 Punathil Kunhabdulla
 Master Javed
 Master Aakash
 Master Abhinav
 Master Amith
 Master Mahek
 Ambika Mohan
 Grace M George
 Kumari Moby Saira Luke

References

2009 films
2000s Malayalam-language films